Richard Arthur Longman is a British racing driver and renowned motorsport preparation expert. He was twice champion of the British Touring Car Championship (then known as the British Saloon Car Championship) in 1978 and 1979 driving a Mini 1275 GT for Patrick Motorsport, which ran the works British Leyland supported team. The following year he switched to a class C Ford Fiesta. In 1984 he was class C champion in his Ford Escort Mk3 RS1600i.

He also has a house in the Bahamas as well as property in the New Forest, Hampshire.

Racing record

Complete British Saloon Car Championship results
(key) (Races in bold indicate pole position; races in italics indicate fastest lap.)

† Events with 2 races staged for the different classes.

References

English racing drivers
British Touring Car Championship drivers
British Touring Car Championship Champions
Living people
1946 births